The Klamath River Hydroelectric Project is a series of hydroelectric dams and other facilities on the mainstem of the Klamath River, in a watershed on both sides of the California/Oregon border.

The infrastructure was constructed between 1903 and 1962, the first elements engineered and built by the California Oregon Power Company ("Copco").  That company merged into Pacific Power and Light in 1961, and is now the energy company PacifiCorp.  PacifiCorp continues to operate the project for profit, producing a maximum of 169 MW from seven generating stations. The company owns all but one of the dams.

As of 2016, four of the project's dams are scheduled for removal by the year 2020, pending approval by the governing Federal Energy Regulatory Commission.  A fifth is running at reduced output, facing eventual decommissioning.

The project can be distinguished from the Klamath Project which is a set of United States Bureau of Reclamation (USBR) dams on upstream tributaries of the Klamath, operated primarily for agricultural water storage.  The Link River Dam belongs to both.

Inventory 

PacifiCorp owns all project dams, except for Link River Dam, which is owned by the U.S. Bureau of Reclamation.  All dams are on the mainstem of the Klamath, except for Fall Creek Dam, on a tributary.  The project's dams include:

 The Fall Creek Dam, located north of Copco Dam #2 on a close tributary of the Klamath, built for hydropower generation by the Siskiyou Electric Power Company and operational by 1903
 The Copco Dam #1 (completed 1912-16, expanded 1922) and #2 (completed 1922-1925), both for hydropower generation.  Copco Dam #1 impounds Copco Lake
 The Link River Dam, completed in 1921 primarily for flood control and water storage, with secondary hydropower generation.  It impounds Upper Klamath Lake.  Link River is owned by the U.S. Bureau of Reclamation
 The John C. Boyle Dam, completed in 1958 for hydroelectric power, impounding the John C. Boyle Reservoir
 The Iron Gate Dam, completed in 1964 for flood control and hydropower, the furthest downstream and the tallest dam in the system
 Keno Dam, a non-generating dam impounding Lake Ewauna, built in 1967 to replace the wooden Needle Dam

Dam removal 

As resolution of several long-range issues centered on water rights in the Klamath Basin, the multi-party Klamath Basin Restoration Agreement was signed in early 2008.  Parties to the agreement included the state of California, the state of Oregon, three Native American tribes, four counties, and 35 other local organizations and individuals.

At the time PacifiCorp faced a relicensing cycle with Federal Energy Regulatory Commission, with potentially expensive fixes for salmon passage and to address the growth of the toxic bacteria Microcystis aeruginosa in the Copco and Iron Gate Reservoirs.

On September 29, 2009, Pacificorp reached an agreement in principle with the other KBRA parties to remove the John C. Boyle Dam, the Iron Gate Dam, and Copco #1 and #2, pending Congressional approval.

Congress did not act, so as of February 2016, the states of Oregon and California, the dam owners, federal regulators and other parties reached a further agreement to remove those four dams by the year 2020, contingent only on approval by the Federal Energy Regulatory Commission. The new plan has been endorsed by the governors of California and Oregon. Dam removal was endorsed by U.S. Secretary of the Interior Sally Jewell in 2016, though that endorsement was later rescinded by U.S. Secretary of the Interior David Bernhardt in 2019.

References

External links 

 66-page project narrative history, commissioned by PacifiCorp

Klamath River

Water in Oregon
Water in California
Hydroelectric power plants in Oregon
Klamath Mountains